Gaharwar or Gahadavala dynasty have their own legacy and are basically known as Rathore (a Rajput clan) of Suryavanshi kshatriya (claim to be descendants of lord Rama) found in the areas of Kanyakubja( today's Kannauj district of Uttar pradesh),Varanasi district, Kushinagar, Deoria, Gorakhpur, Prayagraj district, Mirzapur, Sonbhadra and many parts of Eastern U.P and in surrounding areas of Uttar Pradesh. Also found majorly in some areas of Bihar and Jharkhand as well. "Bundelas of Bundelkhand are said to be the direct descendants of Gahadavalas/Gaharwaras."

References

Rajput clans of Bihar
Rajput clans of Uttar Pradesh
Rajput clans of Madhya Pradesh
Rajput clans of Rajasthan